Ingalls Memorial Hospital is a general medical and surgical hospital located in Harvey, Illinois, a south suburb of Chicago, Illinois. Ingalls is a secular establishment. In 2016, Ingalls completed a merger with the University of Chicago Medicine. Ingall's retains its own board and president but its corporate parent is now UChicago Medicine. Ingalls Memorial Hospital is now known as UChicago Medicine Ingalls Memorial.

Locations 
Ingalls main  campus is located at One Ingalls Drive, Harvey, IL 60426, USA. Ingalls has additional facilities of varying sizes and capabilities all located in the southern suburbs of Chicago.

 Ingalls Family Care Center, Calumet City, Illinois	
 Ingalls Family Care Center, Tinley Park, Illinois	
 Ingalls Family Care Center, Flossmoor, Illinois
 Ingalls Care Center, Crestwood, Illinois
 Ingalls Care Center, South Holland, Illinois

Size 

 Licensed for approximately 582 beds.
 Approximately 3000 employees.

Activity during 2003-2004 

 Admissions: 19,647
 Inpatient surgeries: 3,561
 Outpatient visits: 247,218
 Outpatient surgeries: 3,605
 Emergency room visits: 37,859
 Births: 1,582

Memberships and awards 

 41st in Digestive disorders
 36th in neurology and neurosurgery
 Joint Commission on Accreditation of Healthcare Organizations (JCAHO)
 Commission on Accreditation of Rehabilitation Facilities (CARF)

See also 

 Rumination syndrome
 Digestive Disorders Foundation

External links 
 
 Harvey 
 Association of Community Cancer Centers Ingalls’ Page
 U.S. News & World Report Ingalls' Page

Harvey, Illinois
Hospitals in Cook County, Illinois